Johan Rutger Sernander (2November 186627October 1944) was a Swedish botanist, geologist and archaeologist. He was one of the founders of the study of palynology which would later be developed by Lennart von Post, as well as a pioneer in the early Swedish natural conservation and ecology movements. He was among other societies a member of the Royal Swedish Academy of Sciences, the Royal Swedish Academy of Letters, History and Antiquities and Norwegian Academy of Science and Letters. Sernander was one of the founders of the Swedish Society for Nature Conservation in 1909, as well as its chairman during a number of the first years.

See also 
Blytt–Sernander system

References 

People from Närke
20th-century Swedish geologists
Swedish naturalists
Phytogeographers
Palynologists
1866 births
1944 deaths
Burials at Uppsala old cemetery
19th-century Swedish geologists
Members of the Royal Society of Sciences in Uppsala
Members of the Royal Swedish Academy of Sciences
Members of the Royal Swedish Academy of Letters, History and Antiquities
Members of the Norwegian Academy of Science and Letters